Toufic Jaber (born 24 June 1962) is a Lebanese diplomat currently serving as Lebanon ambassador to Serbia, Macedonia, Montenegro, Bosnia, Croatia, Slovenia and Kosovo.

Education 
Jaber was educated at Beirut University College where graduated with a bachelor’s degree in Economics in 1986 and obtained a master’s of science degree in Agricultural Economics from the American University of Beirut in 1988 before earning a PhD in Economic Development and Marketing Efficiency Analysis from University of London, Wye College, in the United Kingdom in 1994

Career 
Jaber started his diplomatic career in 1996 when he Joined the Ministry of Foreign Affairs and deployed on his first foreign mission to the Lebanese Embassy in Jakarta, Indonesia as Head of Mission Chargé d’Affaires from 1999 to 2003 and transferred to Lebanon Embassy in Tokyo, Japan serving as Head of Consular Section from 2003 to 2004 when he became Head of Mission, Chargé d’Affaires at the same embassy in 2004 and served in this position until 2006. He served as Director for Asia, Africa and Australia Division in the Ministry of Foreign Affairs between 2006 and 2007 and The Permanent Mission of Lebanon to the United Nations in New York and Expert on West African issues from 2007 to 2009. He sat on the UN security Council as Alternate Political Coordinator from 2009 to 2012 and was later appointed ambassador and served in Indonesia, Malaysia, Japan before being deployed to Serbia and accredited to Macedonia, Montenegro, Bosnia, Croatia, Slovenia and Kosovo.

References 

Living people
1962 births
Lebanese diplomats
American University of Beirut alumni
Alumni of the University of London
Alumni of Wye College